Mazen Metwaly (born 14 March 1990) is a Saudi Arabian-born Egyptian professional swimmer, specialising in Open water swimming. He competed at the 2012 Summer Olympics.

References

Egyptian male swimmers
1990 births
Living people
Olympic swimmers of Egypt
Swimmers at the 2012 Summer Olympics
Saudi Arabian emigrants to Egypt